"Tati" (stylized in all caps) is a single by American rapper 6ix9ine. It was released commercially on May 27, 2018 as the lead single from the debut studio album Dummy Boy. The song was produced by Boi-1da, Cubeatz and DJ SpinKing, which the latter is also featured on the song. It peaked at number 46 on the US Billboard Hot 100.

Music video
An accompanying music video for the song premiered on WorldStarHipHop via its YouTube channel. It features 6ix9ine in a red SUV with a bandana vinyl, in an apartment with various women, and in the streets of Brooklyn, New York City with some members of the Bloods gang.

Charts

Certifications

References

External links
  on SoundCloud

2018 singles
2018 songs
6ix9ine songs
Songs written by 6ix9ine
Songs written by Kevin Gomringer
Songs written by Tim Gomringer
Songs written by Boi-1da
Song recordings produced by Boi-1da
Song recordings produced by Cubeatz